is a Japanese footballer who plays as a attacking midfielder for the Albanian club Burreli.

Club career

Burreli
On 6 September 2020, Takahashi signed a two-year contract with Kategoria e Parë club Burreli and received squad number 15. On 1 November 2020, he made his debut with Burreli in the 2020–21 Albanian Cup first round against Kastrioti after being named in the starting line-up.

Career statistics

Club

References

1998 births
Living people
Japanese footballers
Japanese expatriate footballers
Expatriate footballers in Albania
Japanese expatriate sportspeople in Albania
Association football midfielders
Kategoria e Parë players
KS Burreli players